ATF Sinner (born Adam Buszko April 19, 1975, in Warsaw), also known as Adam The First Sinner, is a Polish musician, vocalist, composer and multi-instrumentalist. He graduated in psychology at the University of Warsaw.

Buszko is a guitarist, singer and songwriter of the death metal band Hate, which he formed in 1990 with the drummer Piotr Kozieradzki (Riverside) and guitarist Andrzej Kułakowski.

He also formed the industrial rock band Mothernight in which he performs under the stage name Deimos. In 2007 has recorded the Mothernight album with the band – released by Locomotive Records same year.

Gear
Ran Invader Custom 6 String
Ran Thor Custom 6 String
Ibanez ARZ 700 6 String
Ibanez Prestige RG 7 String
Bc rich mockingbird

Discography

 Mothernight - Mothernight (LP, 2007, Locomotive Records)

References

Musicians from Warsaw
Living people
1975 births
Polish heavy metal guitarists
Polish heavy metal bass guitarists
Polish keyboardists
Polish heavy metal singers
English-language singers from Poland
Polish lyricists
Male bass guitarists
21st-century Polish male singers
21st-century Polish singers
21st-century bass guitarists
Polish male guitarists